Mahadewa Portaha  is a village development committee in Siraha District in the Sagarmatha Zone of south-eastern Nepal; the population is 6,977 people.

References

External links
UN map of the municipalities of  Siraha District

Populated places in Siraha District